Cherry Ann Rondina, popularly known as Sisi, is a Filipina professional indoor and beach volleyball player. She was a former member and captain of the UST Golden Tigresses volleyball team. She is a 4-time UAAP Beach Volleyball MVP and the UAAP Season 81 Women’s Volleyball MVP and Athlete of the Year. She is a current member of the Philippines Women Beach Volleyball team.

Personal life
Rondina was born in Compostela, Cebu, to a family of three sisters to Alona, a dressmaker, and Arnold Rondina, a fisherman.

Career

Rondina first found her love for sports in track and field, in which she would usually grace the sands of the beach near her home. It was only in her 3rd grade in elementary when she first held a volleyball on her hands with her mother. The next day, a tryout was held in her town and she decided to join. Little did Sisi know, this little stint of her would take her to places.

Rondina continued to develop her skills and prowess in volleyball until she became a varsity player of her highschool's team. She represented Central Visayas at the different editions of Palarong Pambansa, where she was first discovered by the UST recruitment staff. Eventually, she won the 2013 Palarong Pambansa Best Attacker individual award.

Collegiate
Rondina started representing the University of Santo Tomas in UAAP Season 77, playing in beach volleyball to which she won the championship and bagged the MVP award. She debuted in indoor volleyball in UAAP Season 77.

In Season 78, Rondina-Rivera tandem failed to defend their crown in UAAP Beach Volleyball Tournament. The indoor team was unable to make it into Final 4. 

After a disappointing season, Rondina reclaims the UAAP Season 79 Beach Volleyball title together with her new partner, Jem Nicole Gutierrez. She bagged her 2nd Most Valuable Award in the UAAP Beach Volleyball Tournament. She and UST Tigresses made their Final 4 comeback in UAAP Season 79 with 9–5 win–loss record UST failed to advance to Finals bowing down to defending champion De La Salle Lady Spikers in the semifinals. 

Rondina and her new partner Caitlin Viray swept the UAAP Season 80 Beach Volleyball tournament, successfully defended their crown. She also got her 3rd Most Valuable Player award for the season. UST Tigresses fails to advance in the Final 4 of UAAP Season 80 women's volleyball tournament. Rondina bagged the Best Scorer award. 

In UAAP Season 81, Rondina and rookie Baby Love Barbon brought UST's 6th Beach Volleyball Championship title, making it as the winningest team in the UAAP Beach Volleyball Tournament. Rondina got her 4th Most Valuable Award.

UST"s Skipper Rondina led her team into 10–4 win–loss record in the elimination round of UAAP Season 81 women's volleyball tournament, the team's best record since UAAP Season 73. UST Tigresses won over De La Salle Lady Spikers in playoffs and semi-finals and sent UST to its first Finals appearance after 7 year drought. Rondina emerged as the Most Valuable Player of Season 81, also bagged the 2nd Best Open Hitter and Best Scorer awards.

During the closing and awarding UAAP ceremonies conducted at the Mall of Asia Arena, the board awarded Rondina as Athlete of the Year for the collegiate team sports category. She was the only female athlete to be given the award for season 81.

Professional

Rondina and Bernadeth Pons of Petron Sprint 4T won the championship of the 2017 Philippine SuperLiga Beach Challenge Cup and Rondina was awarded the Most Valuable Player. With the Petron Blaze Spikers, she won the 2017 PSL All-Filipino Conference gold medal and the 2017 PSL Grand Prix Conference silver medal.

Rondina-Pons tandem successfully defended their title for Petron in 2018 Philippine Super Liga Beach Challenge Cup.

In 2018, Rondina alongside Angeline Gervacio represented Philippines in 2018 FIVB Beach Volleyball World Tour Manila Open and made it into quarterfinals.

In 2019, the championship tandem of Rondina-Pons is one of the representatives of Philippines in 2019 Southeast Asian Games Beach Volleyball Tournament where they won bronze together with Dzi Gervacio and Dij Rodriguez and 2019 FIVB Beach Volleyball World Tour Boracay Open.

Clubs
  Foton Tornadoes (2016)
  Petron Blaze Spikers (2017 - 2019)
  Creamline Beach Volleyball Team (2020-2021)

Awards

Individual
 UAAP Season 77 Beach Volleyball "Most Valuable Player"
 UAAP Season 79 Beach Volleyball "Most Valuable Player"
 2017 PSL Beach Volleyball Challenge Cup "Most Valuable Player"
 UAAP Season 80 Beach Volleyball "Most Valuable Player"
 UAAP Season 80 "Best Scorer"
 2018 Philippine Super Liga Invitational Cup "Second Best Outside Spiker"
 UAAP Season 81 Beach Volleyball "Most Valuable Player"
 UAAP Season 81 "Best Scorer"
 UAAP Season 81 "Most Valuable Player"
 UAAP Season 81 "Second Best Outside Spiker"
UAAP Season 81 "Athlete of the Year" for the Team Sports category
2019 Philippine Super Liga All-Filipino Conference “2nd Best Outside Spiker”
2019 Philippine Super Liga Invitational Cup “1st Best Outside Spiker”
2019 Philippine Super Liga Invitational Cup “Best Scorer”

Collegiate 
 2015 Queen of Sands Beach Volleyball Tournament –  2nd Runner-Up, with UST Golden Tigresses
 2015 Ibalong Festival Beach Volleyball Open Conference –  Champion, with UST Golden Tigresses 
 2015 Nestea Beach Intercollegiate Volleyball Competition –  Champion, with UST Golden Tigresses 
 2016 Nestea Beach Intercollegiate Volleyball Competition –  Champion, with UST Golden Tigresses 
 UAAP Season 77 Beach Volleyball –  Champion, with UST Golden Tigresses
 UAAP Season 79 Beach Volleyball –  Champion, with UST Golden Tigresses
 UAAP Season 79 Indoor Volleyball –  2nd runner-up, with UST Golden Tigresses
 UAAP Season 80 Beach Volleyball –  Champion, with UST Golden Tigresses
 UAAP Season 81 Beach Volleyball –  Champion, with UST Golden Tigresses
 UAAP Season 81 Indoor Volleyball –  1st runner-up, with UST Golden Tigresses

Club
 2016 Philippine SuperLiga All-Filipino –  1st Runner-Up, with Foton Tornadoes
 2016 Philippine SuperLiga Beach Volleyball Challenge Cup –  1st Runner-Up, with Foton Tornadoes
 2017 Philippine SuperLiga Grand Prix –  Champion, with Foton Tornadoes
 2017 Philippine SuperLiga Beach Volleyball Challenge Cup –  Champion, with Petron Sprint 4T
 2017 Philippine SuperLiga All-Filipino –  Champion, with Petron Blaze Spikers
 2017 Philippine SuperLiga Grand Prix –  1st Runner-Up, with Petron Blaze Spikers
 2018 PSL Beach Volleyball Challenge Cup –  Champion, with Petron XCS
 2018 Ibalong Festival Beach Volleyball Open Conference –  Champion, with Petron

References

1996 births
Filipino women's volleyball players
Living people
Sportspeople from Cebu
University of Santo Tomas alumni
University Athletic Association of the Philippines volleyball players
Opposite hitters
Competitors at the 2019 Southeast Asian Games
Southeast Asian Games bronze medalists for the Philippines
Southeast Asian Games medalists in volleyball
Filipino women's beach volleyball players
Competitors at the 2021 Southeast Asian Games
21st-century Filipino women
Outside hitters